

Events
 24 August — Amanieu de Sescars wrote , a salut d'amor (love letter)

Works published
 Fujiwara no Tameuji, editor, Shokushūi Wakashū (続拾遺和歌集, "Collection of Gleanings of Japanese Poems Continued"), an imperial anthology of Japanese waka; ordered by the Retired Emperor Kameyama about 1276, consisting of twenty volumes containing 1,461 poems

Births
 Kokan Shiren (died 1347), Japanese Rinzai Zen patriarch and celebrated poet in Chinese

Deaths
 Peire Cardenal (born 1180), an Occitan troubadour
 Ulrich von Liechtenstein  (born 1200), a German Minnesänger

13th-century poetry
Poetry